Blakea brunnea is a species of plant in the family Melastomataceae. It is found in Honduras and Panama.

References

brunnea
Endangered plants
Taxonomy articles created by Polbot